Sadleir is a suburb in south-western Sydney, in the state of New South Wales, Australia. Sadleir is located 37 kilometres south-west of the Sydney central business district, in the local government area of the City of Liverpool.

History
Sadleir was named after Richard Sadleir, the first mayor of Liverpool in 1872. Sadleir was part of the Green Valley housing estate, which was subdivided in 1960.

Demographics 
According to the 2016 census, Sadleir had a population of 3,135. The average age was 33, slightly lower than the national average, with higher than expected numbers of people in the 0-14 and 65 plus age groups. There was a significant housing commission population with around a third of the suburb's dwellings belonging to the Department of Housing. The median household income of $861	 per week was substantially less than the national average ($1438). In Sadleir 56.3% of people were born in Australia, with the most common countries of birth were Vietnam 7.2%, Lebanon 6.3%, Iraq 3.8%, New Zealand 1.9% and Fiji 1.5%.

Education
Sadleir Public School is the only school in the suburb. The nearest high school is in neighbouring Miller and Ashcroft, New South Wales.

References

Suburbs of Sydney
City of Liverpool (New South Wales)